Plasmodium unalis is a parasite of the genus Plasmodium subgenus Novyella. As in all Plasmodium species, P. unalis has both vertebrate and insect hosts. The vertebrate hosts for this parasite are birds.

Taxonomy
It was described in 2013 by Mantilla et al.

Distribution
This species occurs in Colombia. It may also be present in other countries in Americas.

Hosts
This species infects the great thrush (Turdus fuscater).

References

unalis
Parasites of birds